is the second single of the J-pop idol group Morning Musume sub-group Morning Musume Sakuragumi. In addition to the title song and its karaoke version, the single also contains Morning Musume Sakuragumi versions of the earlier Morning Musume songs "Say Yeah!: Motto Miracle Night" and "Daite Hold on Me!". "Say Yeah!: Motto Miracle Night" was originally featured on the Best! Morning Musume 1 album and "Daite Hold on Me!" on the "Daite Hold on Me!" single. Morning Musume Otomegumi also did a version of "Say Yeah!: Motto Miracle Night" at the same time as Morning Musume Sakuragumi on the "Yūjō (Kokoro no Busu ni wa Naranee!)" single.

The single reached number two on the Oricon weekly charts and sold roughly 61,929 copies. This was 8,598 copies more than Otomegumi's 2nd single "Yūjō (Kokoro no Busu ni wa Naranee!)".

Track listings

CD 
 "Sakura Mankai"
 "Say Yeah!: Motto Miracle Night (Morning Musume Sakuragumi Version)"
 "Daite Hold on Me! (Morning Musume Sakuragumi Version)"
 "Sakura Mankai" (Instrumental)

Single V DVD 
This DVD also included Morning Musume Otomegumi's Yūjō "(Kokoro no Busu ni wa Naranee!)".
1 "Sakura Mankai" / Morning Musume Sakuragumi
3 "Sakura Mankai (Another Version)" / Morning Musume Sakuragumi

Members at time of single 
2nd generation: Mari Yaguchi
4th generation: Hitomi Yoshizawa, Ai Kago
5th generation: Ai Takahashi, Asami Konno, Risa Niigaki
6th generation: Eri Kamei

References

External links 
Sakura Mankai at Hello! Project's official site

Morning Musume songs
Japanese-language songs
2004 singles
Song recordings produced by Tsunku
2004 songs
Zetima Records singles